Eremiaphila ammonita is a species of praying mantis native to Jordan.

See also
List of mantis genera and species

References

Eremiaphila
Insects of Asia
Fauna of Jordan
Insects described in 1933